Nueve de Julio was a protected cruiser of the Argentine Navy. The ship was acquired by the Argentine navy as part of the South American naval arms race in the 1890s. Completed in 1893, the vessel remained in service until 1930.

Design and construction
Argentina and its rival Chile purchased a series of cruisers in a local naval arms race from the 1890s to 1902, in which Armstrong of Elswick sold ships to both sides, as well as to Brazil.

Nueve de Julio was designed by Philip Watts and was one of a series of fast protected cruisers built by Armstrong (Elswick, England) for export. The ship was a second-class protected cruiser with quick-firing guns, in contrast to Argentina's previous "Elswick" ship Veinticinco de Mayo which on a similar size hull mounted  main guns.  Nueve de Julio was therefore similar to its predecessor  built for Italy, the first cruiser with an all-quick firing armament, and the following Elswick cruiser  built for Japan, which was the fastest ship in the First Sino-Japanese War and performed well in action.

Nueve de Julio had a double bottom except in the boiler and engine rooms (where the hull was not deep enough) and the protective deck had a raised glacis over the engines. Originally the torpedo tubes would have been , the substitution with a larger type delayed its construction.

History 
Launched in 1892, the ship was completed in 1893. Nueve de Julio remained in service until being discarded in 1930.

See also 
 List of cruisers
 List of ships of the Argentine Navy

References

Notes

Bibliography

Further reading

External links 
 

Cruisers of the Argentine Navy
1892 ships
Ships built by Armstrong Whitworth